The Anti-Hindi agitations of Karnataka were a series of agitations which occurred in the Indian state of Karnataka. On 14 September 2019, several Kannada activists and outfits marched from Townhall to Freedom Park in Bengaluru to protest the celebration of Hindi Divas in the state.

Agitations in 2017

Bengaluru Metro 
The Bangalore Metro Rail Corporation Limited (BMRCL) in the Namma Metro project used three language signboards with Kannada, English and Hindi in the railway stations. Some locals believed that usage of Hindi in the metro as imposition because major portion of the fund to the project given by state government. The pro Kannada activists protested outside the metro stations and started online campaign with Twitter hashtag #NammaMetroHindiBeda (Our Metro, we don't want Hindi).

Banks 
After successful campaign in metros, the activists demanded more usage of Kannada in Banks. They continued similar online campaign with Twitter hashtag #Nammabankukannadabeku ("Our bank, we want Kannada")

Celebration of Hindi Divas in Karnataka 
There was strong opposition towards celebrating Hindi Divas in Karnataka, a non-Hindi speaking state.  Protests were held statewide against this celebration. Activists took to Twitter with #StopHindiImposition to show their support and create awareness on Hindi Chauvinism.

References 

Hindi
Language conflict in India
Protests in India
History of Karnataka (1947–present)